Emblyna is a genus of  cribellate araneomorph spiders in the family Dictynidae, and was first described by R. V. Chamberlin in 1948.

Species
 it contains seventy-six species:
E. acoreensis Wunderlich, 1992 – Azores
E. aiko (Chamberlin & Gertsch, 1958) – USA
E. altamira (Gertsch & Davis, 1942) – USA, Mexico, Greater Antilles
E. angulata (Emerton, 1915) – USA
E. annulipes (Blackwall, 1846) – North America, Europe, Turkey, Caucasus, Russia (Europe to Far East)
E. ardea (Chamberlin & Gertsch, 1958) – USA
E. artemisia (Ivie, 1947) – USA
E. borealis (O. Pickard-Cambridge, 1877) – Russia (northeastern Siberia), USA, Canada, Greenland
Emblyna b. cavernosa (Jones, 1947) – USA
E. branchi (Chamberlin & Gertsch, 1958) – USA
E. brevidens (Kulczyński, 1897) – Europe
E. budarini Marusik, 1988 – Russia (northeastern Siberia)
E. burjatica (Danilov, 1994) – Russia (Urals to Far East)
E. callida (Gertsch & Ivie, 1936) – USA, Mexico
E. capens Chamberlin, 1948 – USA
E. chitina (Chamberlin & Gertsch, 1958) – USA (Alaska), Canada
E. completa (Chamberlin & Gertsch, 1929) (type) – USA
E. completoides (Ivie, 1947) – USA, Canada
E. consulta (Gertsch & Ivie, 1936) – North America
E. cornupeta (Bishop & Ruderman, 1946) – USA, Mexico
E. coweta (Chamberlin & Gertsch, 1958) – USA
E. crocana Chamberlin, 1948 – USA
E. cruciata (Emerton, 1888) – USA, Canada
E. decaprini (Kaston, 1945) – USA
E. evicta (Gertsch & Mulaik, 1940) – USA
E. florens (Ivie & Barrows, 1935) – USA
E. formicaria Baert, 1987 – Ecuador (Galapagos Is.)
E. francisca (Bishop & Ruderman, 1946) – USA
E. hentzi (Kaston, 1945) – USA, Canada
E. horta (Gertsch & Ivie, 1936) – USA
E. hoya (Chamberlin & Ivie, 1941) – USA
E. iviei (Gertsch & Mulaik, 1936) – USA, Mexico
E. joaquina (Chamberlin & Gertsch, 1958) – USA
E. jonesae (Roewer, 1955) – USA
E. kaszabi Marusik & Koponen, 1998 – Mongolia
E. klamatha (Chamberlin & Gertsch, 1958) – USA
E. lina (Gertsch, 1946) – USA, Mexico
E. linda (Chamberlin & Gertsch, 1958) – USA
E. littoricolens (Chamberlin & Ivie, 1935) – USA
E. manitoba (Ivie, 1947) – USA, Canada
E. mariae Chamberlin, 1948 – USA, Mexico
E. marissa (Chamberlin & Gertsch, 1958) – USA
E. maxima (Banks, 1892) – USA, Canada
E. melva (Chamberlin & Gertsch, 1958) – USA
E. mitis (Thorell, 1875) – Norway, Germany, Czech Rep., Hungary, Romania
E. mongolica Marusik & Koponen, 1998 – Russia (Europe to South Siberia), Mongolia
E. nanda (Chamberlin & Gertsch, 1958) – USA
E. oasa (Ivie, 1947) – USA
E. olympiana (Chamberlin, 1919) – USA
E. orbiculata (Jones, 1947) – USA
E. oregona (Gertsch, 1946) – USA
E. osceola (Chamberlin & Gertsch, 1958) – USA
E. oxtotilpanensis (Jiménez & Luz, 1986) – Mexico
E. palomara Chamberlin, 1948 – USA
E. peragrata (Bishop & Ruderman, 1946) – USA, Canada
E. phylax (Gertsch & Ivie, 1936) – USA, Canada
E. pinalia (Chamberlin & Gertsch, 1958) – USA
E. piratica (Ivie, 1947) – USA
E. reticulata (Gertsch & Ivie, 1936) – USA, Mexico
E. roscida (Hentz, 1850) – North, Central America
E. saylori (Chamberlin & Ivie, 1941) – USA
E. scotta Chamberlin, 1948 – USA, Mexico
E. seminola (Chamberlin & Gertsch, 1958) – USA
E. serena (Chamberlin & Gertsch, 1958) – USA
E. shasta (Chamberlin & Gertsch, 1958) – USA
E. shoshonea (Chamberlin & Gertsch, 1958) – USA
E. stulta (Gertsch & Mulaik, 1936) – USA
E. sublata (Hentz, 1850) – USA
E. sublatoides (Ivie & Barrows, 1935) – USA
E. suprenans (Chamberlin & Ivie, 1935) – USA
E. suwanea (Gertsch, 1946) – USA
E. teideensis Wunderlich, 1992 – Canary Is.
E. uintana (Chamberlin, 1919) – USA
E. wangi (Song & Zhou, 1986) – Russia (Europe to South Siberia), Kazakhstan, Mongolia, China
E. zaba (Barrows & Ivie, 1942) – USA
E. zherikhini (Marusik, 1988) – Russia (Middle Siberia to Far East)

References

External links
Emblyna at BugGuide

Araneomorphae genera
Cosmopolitan spiders
Dictynidae